The 2007 Monza Superbike World Championship round was the sixth round of the 2007 Superbike World Championship season. It took place on the weekend of May 11–13, 2007, at the  Monza circuit in Italy.

Superbike race 1 classification

Superbike race 2 classification

Supersport classification

Monza Round
Monza Superbike